Baba Sarvjeet Giri Memorial Intermediate College (Giri College) is affiliated to Prof. Rajendra Singh Rajju Bhaiya University Prayagraj, Prayagraj. It is located in Sarai Bhoopati, Katra Gulab Singh, Pratapgarh district of state Uttar Pradesh, India.

Courses 
The college provides bachelor's degree in the field of arts and for teacher education. The college offers Bachelor of Arts and Bachelor of Education courses.

Infrastructure 
The college's infrastructure is well furnished with all modern facilities. Hostel and library facilities are also available here. All the classrooms of the college are well furnished with all modern facilities

References

External links
Baba Sarvjeet Giri College

Buildings and structures in Pratapgarh district, Uttar Pradesh
Colleges of Dr. Ram Manohar Lohia Awadh University
Intermediate colleges in Uttar Pradesh
Educational institutions in India with year of establishment missing